Thomas Rees ( - 17 November 1876), generally known as Twm Carnabwth, was a leader of the first "Rebecca Riots" in 1839.

Nobody knows who called the meeting in the barn of Glynsaithmaen farm in the Preseli hills, and nobody knows who attended. But the man selected to lead the attack on the new toll-gate at Efail-wen was the 33-year-old red-headed Thomas Rees.

References

External links
 - "Brother Beca", district of Rebecca.

1800s births
1876 deaths
British tax resisters
Rebecca Riots
Welsh rebels